Doctor Jaroslav Kacmarcyk or Jarosław Kaczmarczyk, also spelled Iaroslav Karchmarchyk (1885–1944) was the head of the Lemko-Rusyn Republic from 1918 to 1920. He was tried by the Polish government for anti-Polish agitation on June 6, 1921, and was acquitted.

He was born in Binczarowa, in the Kingdom of Galicia and Lodomeria (present-day Poland).

References

External links 
 https://web.archive.org/web/20070524013638/http://www.carpatho-rusyn.org/cra/chap4.htm
 http://www.carpatho-rusyn.org/lemkos/lemkos.htm
 https://web.archive.org/web/20100614110731/http://www.rusyn.org/hisflorynka.html
 Biography with photo

1885 births
1944 deaths
People from Nowy Sącz County
People from the Kingdom of Galicia and Lodomeria
Lemkos